The Red is the debut studio album by South Korean girl group Red Velvet. It was released on September 9, 2015, by SM Entertainment and distributed by Dreamus, marking their second proper release in 2015 following the debut extended play Ice Cream Cake in March 2015.

The album focuses solely on the group's "Red" image stemming from the group's name and concept, showing the group's vivid and bold image with mainly pop and R&B incorporation. LDN Noise, Ryan S. Jhun, Denzil "DR" Remedios, Dsign Music, Kenzie, Deekay, Charli Taft, Jinbo, Dem Jointz, as well as others, handled production of the album, with S.M. founder Lee Soo-man serving as the executive producer of the album. A similar conceptual follow-up to the album called The Velvet was later released in the first half of 2016, which was composed of mostly R&B tracks and ballads showcasing the "Velvet" half with a more mature and sophisticated side of the girl group.

Upon its release, The Red received positive reviews from critics for its musical diversity while showing the "quirkiness" of Red Velvet. The album was a commercial success, becoming Red Velvet's second chart-topper on the Gaon Album Chart in South Korea. It also attained international success, becoming the group's first number one title on the Billboard World Album Chart, while peaking at number twenty-four on Billboards Heatseekers Albums chart. It was later included as Billboard's 10 Best K-Pop Albums of 2015.

Promotion for the album was preceded by the release of the lead single "Dumb Dumb" on the same release day, along with live performances on weekly music shows for both "Dumb Dumb" and the album track "Huff 'n' Puff". The lead single was a commercial success, peaking at number two on the Gaon Digital Chart and number three on Billboard's World Digital Songs chart while becoming one of the group's signature "Red" singles.

Background and release
Following the group's first major release Ice Cream Cake in March 2015, S.M. Entertainment announced that Red Velvet would be returning with their first full album in early September. On September 3, a series of image teasers were revealed on the group's official Instagram account, along with the album's tracklist. On September 4, the company announced that the full album would be released at midnight on September 9, with "Dumb Dumb" serving as the lead single (aka title track). A series of video teasers was released since September 4, including song previews for "Huff 'n' Puff", "Don't U Wait No More", "Time Slip", "Dumb Dumb" and "Red Dress". The music video for the song was released on September 8 while the full album was released on September 9. There are two physical versions for the album, a ’’Red’’ version and a ’’Blue’’ version.

Composition

Concept 
Following the group's concept of promoting with both "Red" and "Velvet" images (preceded by their first EP in March 2015), The Red focuses solely on their vivid and strong "Red" image, while seeing the girl group embraces their "fun, peppy" pop-oriented side. While talking about the album at a press conference on September 8, the members and the company also hinted at a similar conceptual promotion that will follow suit after The Red, although an S.M. Entertainment representative explained that nothing has been scheduled in particular yet. The album was later proceeded by The Red Summer (2017) and Summer Magic (2018), Red Velvet's summer special extended plays which portray a brighter, more vibrant "Red" sound of the group.

Songs 
The album consists of ten songs with main incorporation from dance-pop and R&B. The opening track and lead single "Dumb Dumb" is described as "an uptempo dance track" with "infectious hook" and "groovy beat". Heavily influenced by funk and hip-hop elements, the song is composed by producer Ryan S. Jhun and British production team LDN Noise, the latter whom have previously written and produced songs for fellow S.M. Entertainment labelmate SHINee and TVXQ. The lyrics describes a girl's awkwardness in front of the person of her affection, comparing herself to that of a mannequin. The rap section of "Dumb Dumb" includes several references to Michael Jackson's song discography, such as  "Beat It", "Bad", "Billie Jean" and "Thriller". It is followed by "Huff 'n' Puff", an electro-pop song that features a dubstep-like breakdown that sings about waking up from a dream and coming back to reality, like Alice falling down the rabbit hole. The third track "Campfire" is described as an R&B pop song that has an ear-catching rhythmical guitar intro. The fourth track "Red Dress" is a dominant dance-pop track with much synth running through the song, clapping-like snare and marching-influenced drumline which tells a story in which a girl wears a red dress and clumsily but slyly tempts a man who treats her only as a child. The soulful, R&B-flavored "Oh Boy" showcases the singing ability and highlights harmonization of the girlgroup, while being the next three songs which are produced by LDN Noise. Ryan S. Jhun co-produced the former two tracks, with additional production by Denzil "DR" Remedios on "Campfire" and Dsign Music on "Red Dress".

The latter half of The Red starts with the sixth track "Lady's Room", an uptempo R&B, synth-pop song that sings about the sisterhood between girls and the happy moments they share. It was one of three tracks produced by Daniel "Obi" Klein along with the next track "Time Slip", which is a 90s-influenced hip hop-based R&B song with lyrics that describes the laziness and listlessness that one feels while going back and forth between dream and reality in the morning. "Time Slip" also sees the participation of British songwriter Charli Taft, whom had previously co-written and produced "Automatic" along with Daniel Klein, while marking the first collaboration from South Korean music producer Jinbo for the girl group. The eighth track "Don't U Wait No More" highlights the group's harmonization over a heavy synth production with a harmonized "Don't you wait no more" hook, with the lyrics revolve around a girl trying to get closer to her hesitant boyfriend, followed by the bossa nova-influenced midtempo pop-rock track "Day 1", which describes the feeling of new love by combining the electric, funky guitar sound and the melodic piano with the vocals of the members. The album ends with "Cool World", a synth-pop uptempo song with hopeful lyrics about embracing and living as themselves.

Promotion
Promoting activities for the album started with a "comeback showcase" by Red Velvet where they performed "Dumb Dumb." They also appeared on a 5-episode live broadcast through the Naver V-Live app called 오방만족! (Satisfying five senses!) Red vs Velvet where they discussed the various concepts of their new album. The first episode was broadcast on September 7. The 2nd episode was broadcast on September 8, with SHINee's Key as the MC. The group made their first comeback stage on M! Countdown on September 10, followed by performances on Music Bank, Show! Music Core and Inkigayo. The group also performed a shortened version "Huff 'n' Puff" on the shows during their first promoting week. The Red was further promoted by Red Velvet on their Red Room Asia tour in 2017, alongside their other releases from 2014 to their latest release The Red Summer at the time.

Reception

Upon its release, The Red received positive reviews from critics for the group embracing their "quirky" side. Billboards Jeff Benjamin called The Red "an impressive, solid debut album" and stated that it "indicates big things for the act that needs to follow in the footsteps of their beloved female label mates Girls' Generation and f(x)." while Noisey stated that it's "perhaps the strongest top-to-bottom K-pop album to date," praising its "daredevil song forms, harmonies richer and smarter than anything on western dials in a quarter-century, and nonstop virtuoso songsmith hooks—without so much as a single English inflection out of place." A review from Seoulbeats stated that The Red did "live up" to the expectations of the group's earlier "Red" releases, while praising the potential of the group's vocal. In a mixed review from IZM, writer Kim Do-hyun commented that the album "should have been accompanied with more careful judgments", giving the album two and a half stars, though highlighting tracks like "Campfire", "Oh Boy", "Day 1" and "Cool World".  Billboard also included it in their '10 Best K-Pop Albums of 2015' and called it "one of the year's most enjoyable and experimental pop LPs." The single "Dumb Dumb" was later included at #70 on Billboard's list of 100 Greatest Girl Group Songs of All Time, praising its hooks and being one of "the most addictive singles in pop". In a separated top 25 Red Velvet songs by Billboard, four songs from The Red made its appearance, including "Dumb Dumb" at No. 4, "Cool World" at No. 13, "Time Slip" at No. 15, and lastly "Red Dress" at No. 21.

Commercial performance 
On the week of September 6, 2015, The Red debuted and topped the weekly Gaon Album Chart for one week, becoming the group's second chart-topper in 2015 after their debut extended play in March 2015. The entire ten tracks also charted on the Gaon Digital Chart in the same week. With 46,571 copies sold, The Red was the 53rd best-selling album in 2015 on the year-end Gaon Album Chart, and has since achieved a cumulative sales of almost 80,000 copies as of August 2018. It also attained success in the United States, becoming their first release to top the Billboard's World Albums Chart, and peaked at number twenty-four on its Heatseekers Albums chart, having achieved a total sales of 3,000 copies as of March 30, 2018. Elsewhere, the album also debuted and peaked at No. 47 on the Japanese Oricon Albums Chart, earning a total sales of almost 4,500 copies.

The music video for "Dumb Dumb" debuted at number one on YinYueTai's V-Chart Korea. It is also the most viewed K-pop video in America and worldwide for the month of September. Dazed Digital named "Dumb Dumb" their top K-pop track of 2015. In December, "Dumb Dumb" was included on Rolling Stones list of the '10 Best Music Videos of 2015'.

Track listing

Charts

Weekly charts

Monthly charts

Year-end chart

Sales

Release history

Accolade

Year-end award

References

Red Velvet (group) albums
2015 albums
Korean-language albums
SM Entertainment albums
Genie Music albums
Albums produced by LDN Noise